Mengon is an air base in Amur Oblast, Russia located 17 km southwest of Elban.  Its purpose is unknown; it may be a diversion or dispersal airbase for bombers from Zavitinsk (air base) or Ukrainka (air base).  It has a very long runway and large tarmac. Long runway was designated as a "eastern alternate airport" for landing the Buran spacecraft.

References
RussianAirFields.com

Soviet Air Force bases
Soviet Long Range Aviation bases